Tell Hawsh (also spelled Talhoush) is a village in northern Syria located west of Homs in the Homs Governorate. According to the Syria Central Bureau of Statistics, Tell Hawsh had a population of 1,609 in the 2004 census.  Its inhabitants are predominantly Alawites.

References

Bibliography

 

Populated places in Talkalakh District
Alawite communities in Syria